Alexandros Giotopoulos (born 1944 in Paris) is a convicted terrorist, currently serving seventeen life sentences plus 25 years imprisonment. He was found guilty in 2003 of leading the Marxist-Leninist Greek urban guerrilla group Revolutionary Organization 17 November (17N).

Biography 
Giotopoulos was born in Paris in 1944, the son of Dimitris Giotopoulos. He was raised in Chalandri and in 1962 he returned to Paris where he studied mathematics and economics. Several decades later, from inside the prison, he continued his studies with a Master in Theoretical Mathematics and later he earned a PhD degree from the University of Paris.

He was part of the United Democratic Left, and later, an opponent of the Greek military junta of 1967-1974. On 29th of August 1972 he participated in the bombing of the US embassy in Greece.

Revolutionary Organization 17 November 
17N was responsible for a series of armed robberies, bombings, and assassinations of prominent Greek and foreign politicians, journalists, diplomats, and businessmen that left twenty-three people dead. Giotopoulos was identified as its leader after the arrest and confession of Savvas Xiros, another member of 17N, following a failed bombing attempt on a hydrofoil shipping company in Piraeus.

Giotopoulos appealed his conviction, and described himself as the victim of "an Anglo-American conspiracy". At the start of his appeal, in 2005, he received support from left-wing organisations and personalities in France, where he was born, including Alain Krivine and Pierre Vidal-Naquet. However, on May 3, 2007, his conviction and those of his 17N accomplices were sustained by the court of appeals.

References

Giotopoulos, Alexandros
Giotopoulos, Alexandros
Greek prisoners sentenced to life imprisonment
Criminals from Paris
Prisoners sentenced to life imprisonment by Greece
Stalinism
Anti-revisionists
Greek communists
Terrorism in Greece
Communist terrorism
Resistance to the Greek junta